Paul Leo Menard (born May 22, 1952) is a Canadian former professional ice hockey goaltender. During the 1972–73 season, Menard played one game in the World Hockey Association with the Chicago Cougars.

References

External links

1952 births
Living people
Canadian ice hockey goaltenders
Chicago Cougars players
Long Island Cougars players
Rhode Island Eagles players
Verdun Maple Leafs (ice hockey) players